Cominella  lineolata, common name the spotted cominella, is a species of predatory sea snail, a marine gastropod mollusc in the family Cominellidae, .

Description
The length of the shell varies between 20 mm and 39 mm.

The smooth shell is spindle-shaped. The spire is elongated and pointed. The siphonal canal is short. The oval aperture is pretty large. The outer lip is marked throughout its whole extent by deep violet colored lines, crossed by white lines. The columella is smooth, and of a bright yellow color, as well as the edge of the right lip. Externally, the ground color is of a greenish brown, banded with black. These transverse striae are definite and at regular distances; six or eight appear on the body whorl. The operculum is very small, unguiculated, pointed, and of a reddish brown.

Distribution
This marine species occurs off New Zealand and Australia (New South Wales, South Australia, Tasmania, Victoria, Western Australia).

References

 Lamarck, J.B.P.A. de M. 1809. Philosophie zoologique. Paris : Dentu Vol. 1 xxv + 428 pp.
 
  Reeve, L.A. 1847. Monograph of the genus Buccinum. pls 13-14 in Reeve, L.A. (ed). Conchologia Iconica. London : L. Reeve & Co. Vol. 3
 Pritchard, G.B. & Gatliff, J.H. 1898. Catalogue of the marine shells of Victoria. Part I. Proceedings of the Royal Society of Victoria 10(2): 236-284 
 Powell A W B, New Zealand Mollusca, William Collins Publishers Ltd, Auckland, New Zealand 1979 
 Wilson, B. 1994. Australian Marine Shells. Prosobranch Gastropods. Kallaroo, WA : Odyssey Publishing Vol. 2 370 pp
 Donald, K.M, Winter, D.J., Ashcroft, A.L. & Spencer, H.G. (2015). Phylogeography of the whelk genus Cominella (Gastropoda: Buccinidae) suggests long-distance counter-current dispersal of a direct developer. Biological Journal of the Linnean Society of London 115: 315-332

External links
 
 

Cominellidae
Gastropods of New Zealand
Gastropods described in 1809